Four Sons is a 1928 American silent drama film directed and produced by John Ford and written for the screen by Philip Klein from a story by I. A. R. Wylie first published in the Saturday Evening Post as "Grandmother Bernle Learns Her Letters" (1926).

It is one of only a handful of survivors out of the more than 50 silent films Ford directed between 1917 and 1928. It starred Margaret Mann, James Hall, and Charles Morton. The film is also notable for the presence of the young John Wayne in an uncredited role as an officer. Though "silent," it was released with a Movietone music and sound effects track.

A family is torn apart by the advent of World War I. It was remade in 1940 with the same title, starring Don Ameche and Eugenie Leontovich, and directed by Archie Mayo, although the war was updated to World War II.

Plot 

Mother Bernle is a widow in Bavaria with four sons: Franz, Johann, Andreas and Joseph.

Joseph receives a job offer from the United States, and he is given money to travel there by his mother.

The First World War is heating up. Franz, who is already serving in the German army, is joined by first Johann and then Andreas who is forced into the army.

In New York, Joseph is married with a newborn son. He is running a delicatessen and when America enters the war, Joseph enlists to fight for the American side. When Joseph's enlistment is discovered, it causes problems for Mother Bernle because she is shunned in her village.

Franz and Johann are killed on the Eastern Front. Andreas is wounded on the Western Front and dies in the arms of his brother Joseph.

Joseph returns to New York to discover that the delicatessen has prospered in his absence. He sends for his mother to join him, and she departs her village only to end up hopelessly lost wandering New York. A policeman brings her to Joseph's apartment, where she joyfully joins her son, daughter-in-law and grandson.

Preservation
The Academy Film Archive preserved Four Sons in 1999.

Cast

References

External links 
 
 Four Sons at Virtual History

1928 films
1928 drama films
Silent American drama films
American silent feature films
American World War I films
Films about immigration to the United States
American black-and-white films
Films directed by John Ford
Fox Film films
Transitional sound drama films
Films set in Germany
Films based on works by I. A. R. Wylie
Photoplay Awards film of the year winners
1920s American films